The 2018–19 Israeli Women's Cup (Gvia HaMedina Nashim) was the 21st season of Israel's women's nationwide football cup competition. The competition began on 25 October with one first round match.

First round

Second round

Quarter-finals

Semi-finals

Final

References 

Israel Women's Cup seasons
2018–19 domestic association football cups
2018–19 in Israeli women's football